The Chinese Ambassador to Moldova is the official representative of the People's Republic of China to the Republic of Moldova.

List of representatives

See also
Ambassadors of China

References 

Moldova
China
Ambassadors